Nikolsk (also listed as Nikolsk South) is an airport in Russia located 5 km southeast of Nikolsk in Vologda Oblast. It is a small paved civilian airfield with parking area and administration buildings.

References 

Defunct airports
Airports built in the Soviet Union
Airports in Vologda Oblast